NVHS may refer to:
Neuqua Valley High School
New Vista High School
North Valleys High School
Neponset Valley Humane Society
Nvidia High-Speed Signaling, see NVLink
Narara Valley High School